Viva La Bam is an MTV television series that followed Bam Margera and his crew as they undertook challenges, performed stunts and traveled the world. The show ran for five seasons between 2003 and 2005, concluding with a total of 43 episodes, three of which were unaired.

Series overview

Episodes

Season 1 (2003)

Season 2 (2004)

Season 3 (2004)

Season 4 (2005)

Season 5 (2005)

Specials

References

External links
Viva La Bam from MTV
All Viva La Bam episodes from MTV
Skatopia.org referenced from 2.5 Mardi Gras Pt.2

CKY